Yajur (Yâjûr) was a Palestinian Arab village located  southeast of Haifa. It was depopulated during the 1947–48 Civil War in Mandatory Palestine on April 25, 1948.

History
Fragments of glass, and tombs with sarcophagi are located in the old village area today.

Yajur was mentioned as part of the domain of the Crusaders during the hudna (truce) between the Crusaders based in Acre and the Mamluk sultan Al Mansur Qalawun declared in 1283.

Ottoman era
In 1799, it was noted on the map that Pierre Jacotin compiled that year, though it was misnamed as Beled el Charq (=Balad al-Sheikh).

In 1872, the Ottoman authorities sold land in Yajur to two Lebanese businessmen,  Sursock and Salim al-Khuri.

In 1875, Victor Guérin found the village to have about 200 inhabitants, and that it was surrounded by fig and olive trees.  

A population list from about 1887 showed that Yajur had about 150 inhabitants; all Muslims.

In the early twentieth century the village, named El-Yadschur,  was noted with  153 inhabitants. The village had a  mosque. It was also noted that the villagers no longer owned their land, as it was owned by a selim el-churi, who planned to start silk production in the village.

British Mandate era
In the 1922 census of Palestine Yajur had a population of 202; all Muslims,  while in the 1931 census it was counted with Nesher; together they had 1,449 inhabitants; 554 Muslim, 26 Christians and 858 Jews, in addition to 11 with no religion, in a total of  291 houses.

The area was acquired by the Jewish community as part of the Sursock Purchase. The Lebanese landowners sold land in Yajur to the Zionists, who in turn established the kibbutz of Yagur  in 1922 on what had traditionally been village land.

The village population in the  1945 statistics was 610; 560 Muslims and 50 Christians,  with a total of 2,720 dunams of land.   Of this, Arabs used 57 dunums of land for  plantations and irrigable land, 261 for cereals,  while 18 dunams were classified as built-up land.

1948 and aftermath
Following the war the area was incorporated into the State of Israel. In 1992, the village site was described: "No traces of the houses remain on the site, which is marked by numerous fig trees and a smaller number of olive trees." Kibbutz Yagur uses part of Yajur's former land for agriculture, with cement factories on another part.

Gallery

References

Bibliography

  
 
 
 

 

Mülinen, Egbert Friedrich von 1908, Beiträge zur Kenntnis des Karmels "Separateabdruck aus der Zeitschrift des Deutschen Palëstina-Vereins Band XXX (1907) Seite 117-207 und Band XXXI (1908) Seite 1-258."

External links
 Welcome To Yajur
 al-Yajur, Zochrot
Survey of Western Palestine, Map 5:  IAA, Wikimedia commons 
 Yajur, from the Khalil Sakakini Cultural Center

Arab villages depopulated during the 1948 Arab–Israeli War
District of Haifa